Microbispora corallina is a bacterium with type strain DF-32T (= JCM 10267T). Its name comes from its microscopic appearance resembling coral due to spores on the tips of short sporophores branched from aerial hyphae.

References

Further reading
 
 Foulston, Lucy Clementine. Cloning and Analysis of the Microbisporicin Lantibiotic Gene Cluster from Microbispora corallina. Diss. University of East Anglia, 2010.
 
 Lee, May D. "Antibiotics from microbispora." U.S. Patent No. 6,551,591. 22 Apr. 2003.

External links
 LPSN
 Type strain of Microbispora corallina at BacDive -  the Bacterial Diversity Metadatabase

Actinomycetales
Gram-positive bacteria
Bacteria described in 1999